Eagle County Regional Airport  (Vail/Eagle Airport or the Eagle Vail Airport) is in Gypsum, Colorado, United States, 4 miles from Eagle and 37 miles from Vail. The History Channel rated Eagle County Regional Airport as #8 on its list of Most Extreme Airports in July 2010 due to the elevation, weather, approach through mountainous terrain and challenging departure procedures. In 2008–09 the airport completed a runway repaving and extension project, increasing the runway length to 9,000 feet.

Scheduled passenger airline service into the airport is largely seasonal, with more scheduled flights in winter. During ski season EGE is the second busiest airport in Colorado after Denver International Airport due to its proximity to Vail and Beaver Creek ski resorts. Some passengers prefer to fly into EGE rather than Aspen since Eagle has lower minimums allowing a better potential to land in bad weather. Despite being advertised as Vail Airport by airlines and other entities, it is a 45-minute drive to Vail via the Interstate 70 freeway. Flights during summer have become popular with tourists, with United Airlines and American Airlines offering service nearly year-round.

The airport is popular with private aircraft operators and has one of the top rated fixed-base operators in the country, the Vail Valley Jet Center. Private jet charter operators include Clay Lacy Aviation, Charter Flight Group, Mercury Jets, Jet Partners, and Stratos Jet Charters.

Terminal and facilities
EGE's terminal has one concourse with five gates, built in 1996 and remodeled in 2001, 2007, and 2019. There are four TSA screening lanes, a pre-security concession/gift shop, and three luggage carousels, in addition to a special ski/snowboard slide. In 2012, a new inline baggage handling system was constructed in time for the 2012/13 ski season. Beyond the security checkpoint are a restaurant, coffee shop, gift shop, and bar. The airport also offers free wifi in the terminal. The airport has customs facilities for private aircraft located at the Vail Valley Jet Center.

The facility is in the midst of a terminal expansion project. On July 1, 2019 the first phase of this project opened, with access to the new terminal with four gates with jet bridges, enhanced concessions, and other new aviation technology. The final two ground-loading gates were expected to open in time for the 2019/2020 winter season. As of December 2019, the new TSA checkpoint is open, serving both TSA PreCheck and normal security lines.

Operations
The Eagle County Sheriff provides airport security response. The airport has its own ARFF department with three fire trucks, including two state-of-the-art Oshkosh Striker trucks. The airport has a full complement of snowplows, snow blowers, and powered brooms for snow removal operations, along with a complete runway friction measuring system. The tower is staffed by SERCO contract air traffic controllers. In 2019, a dedicated de-icing pad was built on the South-East section of the airfield.  This allows planes to be de-iced without blocking the commercial ramp and gates.

Aircraft procedures
There is no standard published ILS approach at the airport, but there is a special ILS approach, mostly used by the airlines, which requires permission and training from the FSDO. General aviation aircraft usually use the LDA approach, DME, or under VFR. The airport also has an on-site Beacon Interrogator (BI-6) Radar facility. IFR clearances are given by the Denver Air Route Traffic Control Center (ARTCC).

Airline operations
United flies year-round to Denver on United Express (Skywest Airlines), and nonstop to Chicago–O'Hare in the summer and winter months. American offers near year-round service to Dallas/Fort Worth, operating as American Airlines or American Eagle in every season except fall. In winter, American, Delta, and United Airlines offer service to 11 more cities across the United States including daily flights to Atlanta, Los Angeles, Miami, New York–JFK, Newark, Houston–Intercontinental, and San Francisco, select Saturday flights to New York–LaGuardia and Philadelphia, and select holiday flights to Phoenix and Salt Lake City. Of the regional ski resort airports—excluding Denver and Salt Lake City—Eagle County Regional Airport has the second most regular flights during the winter, behind Aspen, CO, and ahead of Jackson Hole, WY.

Winter airline flights are operated via a variety of jet aircraft including the Boeing 757, Airbus A319 and Boeing 737 as well as Embraer ERJ 175 and Bombardier CRJ700 regional jets on shorter flights.

Ground transportation
Eagle County Airport has several ground transportation options available for commuting to and from the airport. These include private car service providers, shared airport shuttle operators, taxi cabs, and rideshare services. Several car rental companies also operate at the airport.

Airlines and destinations

Early history
Louise Ellen Cooley bought a plot of land in 1911 that served as the foundation for building what would become Eagle County Regional Airport. The area became an attraction to local residents as  barnstormers used the strip to perform aerial tricks and maneuvers.

Harry A. Nottingham (Eagle County Commissioner) was eager to see a fully functional airport for Eagle County. New plans for the airstrip were laid out in 1939 by an engineer from Denver's Airport District Office. Mr. Nottingham borrowed $20.00 for the development of a gravel road which would connect the air strip to the towns of Eagle and Gypsum 
Eagle County Airport was officially dedicated for service as a fully functioning airport on September 14, 1947.

Past air service
During the mid- and late 1970s, only one airline scheduled passenger service into the airport: Rocky Mountain Airways, which flew STOL capable de Havilland Canada DHC-6 Twin Otters followed by larger, 50-seat STOL capable de Havilland Canada DHC-7 Dash 7s nonstop from Denver Stapleton Airport and Aspen. In the late 1970s through the mid-1980s, Rocky Mountain Airways nonstops to Denver were all flown with the larger Dash 7. The April 1, 1987, Official Airline Guide (OAG) listed three airlines serving the airport:  Rocky Mountain Airways operating as Continental Express for Continental Airlines via a code sharing agreement with Dash 7 flights from Denver, Royal West Airlines operating nonstop British Aerospace BAe 146-100 jets from Los Angeles (LAX) on Saturdays, and commuter air carrier Monarch Airlines operating Twin Otters from Aspen, Crested Butte, Grand Junction and Telluride.

The airport was being served by mainline jets in early 1994: American Airlines Boeing 757-200s nonstop from Chicago O'Hare Airport, Dallas/Fort Worth, Miami, and New York La Guardia Airport, Delta Air Lines Boeing 727-200s from Salt Lake City, Northwest Airlines Boeing 757-200s from Minneapolis/St. Paul, and United Airlines Boeing 737-300s from Denver.  The OAG lists 36 jet flights a week operated by these four airlines into the airport early in 1994. Air Canada began flying an Airbus A319 nonstop from Toronto Pearson in 2013 by pre-clearing passengers in Toronto since the airport does not have custom facilities. Air Canada dropped the route after the 2017/2018 winter ski season due to relocating its A319s to other U.S. destinations.

Statistics

Top destinations

Annual traffic

Accidents at or near EGE
On March 27, 1987, a Learjet 24 operated by Connie Kalitta Services impacted terrain 4.7 miles NW of EGE due to descending below the specified approach altitude. All three occupants (two pilots, one passenger) were killed.

In popular culture 
Eagle Vail Airport was featured on the History Channel's special, "Most Extreme Airports", as the world's 8th most extreme airport.

References

External links
 FlyVail.com, official site
 Eagle County Regional Airport (EGE) at Colorado DOT airport directory
 
 

Airports in Colorado
Transportation buildings and structures in Eagle County, Colorado